Saint Artemas of Lystra was a biblical figure. He is mentioned in Paul's Epistle to Titus. He is believed to have served as the Bishop of Lystra, and to have been one of the Seventy Disciples.

References

External links
 Catholic Online

Seventy disciples
People in the Pauline epistles
Epistle to Titus